David Naccache is a cryptographer, currently a professor at the École normale supérieure and a member of its Computer Laboratory. He was previously a professor at Panthéon-Assas University.

Biography
He received his Ph.D. in 1995 from the École nationale supérieure des télécommunications. Naccache's most notable work is in public-key cryptography, including the cryptanalysis of digital signature schemes. Together with Jacques Stern he designed the similarly named but very distinct Naccache-Stern cryptosystem and Naccache-Stern knapsack cryptosystem.

In 2004 David Naccache and Claire Whelan, then employed by Gemplus International, used image processing techniques to uncover redacted information from the declassified 6 August 2001 President's Daily Brief Bin Ladin Determined To Strike in US. They also demonstrated how the same process could be applied to other redacted documents.

Naccache is also a visiting professor and researcher at the Information Security Group of Royal Holloway, University of London.

In 2021, two epidemiologists denounced David Naccache to the management of the École normale supérieure. They accused him of having produced a fraudulent report in November 2018 for Genevrier Laboratories in exchange for a large payment (more than €250,000) in defence of a delisted drug, Chondrosulf.

Awards 
In 2020 Naccache was listed as a Fellow of the IACR, the International Association for Cryptologic Research, "for significant contributions to applied cryptography in industry and academia, and for the service to the IACR."

References

External links

 David Naccache's personal page .

Living people
Modern cryptographers
Public-key cryptographers
French cryptographers
Academic staff of Paris 2 Panthéon-Assas University
Year of birth missing (living people)
Academic staff of the École Normale Supérieure